The Asian Development Tour, founded in 2010, is a professional golf tour. It is the development tour for the Asian Tour, with a relationship analogous to the Web.com Tour to the PGA Tour and the Challenge Tour to the European Tour. Players who fail to earn Asian Tour cards through qualifying school may play on the tour. The top five players on the Order of Merit (money list) at the end of the year will earn an Asian Tour card for the following season. Beginning in 2013, tournaments carry Official World Golf Ranking points, with a minimum of six points to the winner and points to the top six plus ties. Most of the tournaments are in Malaysia, Thailand, Taiwan, and Indonesia. Several of the tournaments are co-sanctioned with the Professional Golf of Malaysia Tour and the All Thailand Golf Tour.

The ADT has a 36-hole cut of fifty plus ties.

For the 2014 ADT season, the ADT changed its policy to award Asian Tour cards to the top five players on the ADT Order of Merit, up from three in previous seasons. Should an ADT player finish within the top 63 on the Asian Tour's Order of Merit, the next ADT golfer is promoted.

Schedule by year
The last full season was in 2019 when 19 events were played. Only one tournament was held in 2020, the Boonchu Ruangkit Championship, in January, an event co-sanctioned with the All Thailand Golf Tour. The remainder of the season was cancelled because of the COVID-19 pandemic. The tour resumed playing at the Gurugram Challenge in late March 2022, co-sanctioned with the Professional Golf Tour of India.

The table below summarises the development of the tour. For some tournaments, the official purse is in local currency instead of United States dollars. The Order of Merit is calculated in U.S. dollars.

Order of Merit winners

Source:

References

External links

 
Professional golf tours
Sports leagues established in 2010